Milin may refer to:

Milin, Lower Silesian Voivodeship (south-west Poland)
Milin, Greater Poland Voivodeship (west-central Poland)
Milín, a village in Příbram District, Czech Republic
Mainling County, in Tibet

People with the surname
 Gabriel Milin, poet
 Isaak Moiseevich Milin, mathematician